John Milton "Jack" Gaver Jr. (September 17, 1940 – January 15, 2002) was an American trainer of Thoroughbred racehorses. He was the son of National Museum of Racing and Hall of Fame trainer John M. Gaver Sr., who was head trainer for the Whittney family's Greentree Stable for 38 years. In 1977 his father suffered a stroke and John Jr. took over his responsibilities at Greentree where he would remain for the next fifteen years. For Greentree he trained back-to-back Champions Late Bloomer in 1978 and Bowl Game in 1979.

Among his important wins, John Gaver Jr. won the most important turf races at the time including the 1979 Turf Classic Invitational Handicap  and Washington, D.C. International Stakes (Forerunner to the Breeders' Cup), and in 1981 the Rothmans International Stakes.

John Gaver Jr. died at age 61 in Hollywood, Florida where he had been working as a track steward. He was buried in the Lexington Cemetery in Lexington, Kentucky.

References

1940 births
2002 deaths
American horse trainers